Martin White may refer to:
 Martin White (politician) (1857–1928), Scottish businessman and Liberal Member of Parliament
 Martin White (comedian) (fl. 2000s–2010s), English musician, comedian and animator
 Max Martin (born 1971), Swedish music producer and songwriter known for a time as Martin White
 Martin White (hurler) (1909–2011), Irish hurler
 Martin White (astronomer), 2011 Guggenheim Fellowship recipient
 Martin White (director) (born 1939), pseudonym of the Italian film director Mario Bianchi
 Martin White (British Army officer) (born 1944)
 Martin White (Royal Navy officer) (1779–1865), Royal Navy admiral and hydrologist

See also 
Minor White (Minor Martin White, 1908–1976), American photographer